Nymphaea alba, the white waterlily, European white water lily or white nenuphar , is an aquatic flowering plant in the family Nymphaeaceae. It is native to North Africa, temperate Asia, Europe and tropical Asia (Jammu and Kashmir).

Description

The flowers are white and they have many small stamens inside.

Taxonomy
It was first published and described by Carl Linnaeus in his book 'Species Plantarum', on page 510 in 1753.

The red variety (Nymphaea alba f. rosea) is cultivated from lake Fagertärn ("Fair tarn") in the forest of Tiveden, Sweden, where it was discovered in the early 19th century. The  discovery led to large-scale exploitation which nearly made it extinct in the wild before it was protected.

Nymphaea candida  is sometimes considered a subspecies of N. alba (N. alba L. subsp. candida ).

Distribution and habitat
It is found all over Europe and in parts of North Africa and the Middle East in fresh water.
In Africa, it is found in Algeria, Morocco and Tunisia. In temperate Asia, Armenia, Azerbaijan, Siberia, Iran, Iraq, Israel and Turkey. It is found in tropical Asia, within the Indian provinces of Jammu and Kashmir. Lastly, within Europe, it is found in Belarus, Estonia, Latvia, Lithuania, Moldova, Russian Federation, Ukraine,
Austria, Belgium, Czech Republic, Germany, Hungary, Netherlands, Poland, Slovakia, Switzerland, Denmark, Finland, Ireland, Norway, Sweden, United Kingdom, Albania, Bosnia and Herzegovina, Bulgaria, Croatia, Greece, Italy, Montenegro, North Macedonia, Romania, Serbia, Slovenia, France, Portugal and Spain.

Phytochemistry
It contains the active alkaloids nupharine and nymphaeine, and is a sedative and an aphrodisiac/anaphrodisiac depending on sources. Although roots and stalks are used in traditional herbal medicine along with the flower, the petals and other flower parts are the most potent. Alcohol can be used to extract the active alkaloids, and it also boosts the sedative effects. The root of the plant was used by monks and nuns for hundreds of years as an anaphrodisiac, being crushed and mixed with wine. In the earliest printed medical textbooks, authors  maintained this use, though warning against consuming large and frequent doses.

References

alba
Flora of Europe
Flora of Asia
National symbols of Kazakhstan
Medicinal plants
Plants described in 1753
Taxa named by Carl Linnaeus